Bikinia durandii is a species of plant in the family Fabaceae. It is found only in Gabon.

References

Detarioideae
Flora of Gabon
Vulnerable plants
Endemic flora of Gabon
Taxonomy articles created by Polbot